The Municipality of Ajdovščina is a municipality with a population of a little over 19,000 located in the Vipava Valley, southwestern Slovenia. The municipality was established in 1994. Its seat is in the town of Ajdovščina. , its mayor is Tadej Beočanin.

Ajdovščina is part of the Slovene Littoral traditional region as well as modern Gorizia statistical region.

The climate is influenced by the Mediterranean (minimum temperature in winter , maximum ; in the summer time maximum temperature , minimum .

Settlements
In addition to the municipal seat of Ajdovščina, the municipality also includes the following settlements:

 Batuje
 Bela
 Brje
 Budanje
 Cesta
 Col
 Črniče
 Dobravlje
 Dolenje
 Dolga Poljana
 Gaberje
 Gojače
 Gozd
 Grivče
 Kamnje
 Kovk
 Kožmani
 Križna Gora
 Lokavec
 Male Žablje
 Malo Polje
 Malovše
 Otlica
 Plače
 Planina
 Podkraj
 Potoče
 Predmeja
 Ravne
 Selo
 Skrilje
 Šmarje
 Stomaž
 Tevče
 Ustje
 Velike Žablje
 Vipavski Križ
 Višnje
 Vodice
 Vrtovče
 Vrtovin
 Žagolič
 Žapuže
 Zavino

Demographics 
Population by native language, 2002 census:
Slovene:      16,760
Serbo-Croatian:  787
Albanian:       164
Macedonian:    40
Italian:          16
Hungarian:       7
German:             3
Others:              38
Unknown:             380

Notable residents
 Martin Baučer (1595–1668), historian
 Ivo Boscarol (born 1956), entrepreneur
 Anton Čebej (1722–1774), painter
 Miša Cigoj (born 1982), dancesport athlete
 Josip Križaj (1911–1948), aviator
 Tobia Lionelli (1647–1714), preacher
 Karel Lavrič (1818–1876), politician
 Danilo Lokar (1892–1989), author
 Veno Pilon (1896–1970), painter
 Marijan Poljšak (born 1945), politician
 Edi Šelhaus (1919–2011), photographer, photojournalist
 Avgust Žigon (1877–1941), literary historian

References

External links

 Municipality of Ajdovščina on Geopedia
  

 
Ajdovscina
1994 establishments in Slovenia